Jerry Reed was an American singer. His discography comprises 50 albums and 59 singles.

Albums

1960s

1970s

1980s

1990s

2000s

Soundtracks

Collaborations

Live Albums

Compilations

Singles

1950s-1960s

1970s

1980s–2000s

Other singles

Guest singles

B-sides

Music videos

Notes
A^ When You're Hot, You're Hot also peaked at number 33 on the RPM Top Albums chart in Canada.
B^ "When You're Hot, You're Hot" also peaked at number 6 on the U.S. Billboard Hot Adult Contemporary Tracks.
C^ "She Got the Goldmine (I Got the Shaft)" also peaked at number 57 on the U.S. Billboard Hot 100.

References

Country music discographies
Rock music discographies
 
 
Discographies of American artists